Jean-Marc Boegner (3 July 1913 – 24 January 2003) was a French diplomat, promoted to the rank of ambassador  in 1973.

Family
Jean-Marc Boegner was born in Paris on 3 July 1913, the son of the theologian and pastor Marc Boegner and brother of the newspaper owner Philippe Boegner. With Odilie Moustier, he had three daughters, one of whom married Josselin de Rohan-Chabot.

Career
Jean-Marc Boegner studied at the Faculty of Letters at the Sorbonne and the École libre des sciences politiques and went on to become:
1939: Attaché at the French embassy in Germany (Berlin) 
1940: Attaché at the French embassy in Turkey (Ankara)
1941: Attaché at the French embassy in Lebanon (Beirut)
1945: Counsellor at the French embassy in Sweden
1947: Counsellor at the French embassy in the Netherlands
1948: Counsellor at the French Foreign Office
1952: Head of Department at the Quai d'Orsay (vice director of treaties)
1954: Minister Plenipotentiary
1955: Chief of Staff of the Minister at the Presidency of the Council of Ministers Gaston Palewski
1958-1959: technical advisor to the President of the Council Charles de Gaulle
January 1959: Technical Adviser to the General Secretariat of the Presidency of the Republic
November 1959: French ambassador to Tunisia
1961-1972: Permanent Representative of France to the European Communities in Brussels
1975-1978: Permanent Representative of France to the OECD
1986-1987: Advisor to the Prime Minister Jacques Chirac

Honours
Commander of the National Order of Merit
Grand officer of the Legion of Honour

Works
  (The Common Market from Six to Nine) (1974)

References

1913 births
2003 deaths
Ambassadors of France to Tunisia
Grand Officiers of the Légion d'honneur
Commanders of the Ordre national du Mérite